The 1990 NFL draft was the procedure by which National Football League teams selected amateur college football players. It is officially known as the NFL Annual Player Selection Meeting. The draft was held April 22–23, 1990, at the Marriott Marquis in New York City, New York. The league also held a supplemental draft after the regular draft and before the regular season.

The Dallas Cowboys would have had the first overall pick in the draft for the second consecutive year by virtue of their league-worst 1–15 record in 1989. However, the Cowboys forfeited their first-round pick by selecting quarterback Steve Walsh in the first round of the previous year's supplemental draft. The first pick instead went to the Atlanta Falcons, who traded it to the Indianapolis Colts. The Colts then used the first overall pick to select quarterback Jeff George.

Player selections

Round one

Round two

Round three

Round four

Round five

Round six

Round seven

Round eight

Round nine

Round ten

Round eleven

Round twelve

Notable undrafted players

Hall of Famers
 Emmitt Smith, running back from University of Florida taken 1st round, 17th overall by the Dallas Cowboys.
Inducted: Professional Football Hall of Fame class of 2010.
 John Randle, defensive tackle from Texas A&M-Kingsville University, Undrafted.
Inducted: Professional Football Hall of Fame class of 2010.
 Shannon Sharpe, tight end from Savannah State University, taken 7th round, 192nd overall by the Denver Broncos.
Inducted: Professional Football Hall of Fame class of 2011.
 Cortez Kennedy, defensive tackle from University of Miami, taken 1st round, 3rd overall by the Seattle Seahawks
Inducted: Professional Football Hall of Fame class of 2012.
 Junior Seau, linebacker from University of Southern California, taken 1st round, 5th overall by the San Diego Chargers
Inducted: Professional Football Hall of Fame class of 2015 (posthumous).
 LeRoy Butler, strong safety from Florida State University, taken 2nd round, 48th overall by the Green Bay Packers
Inducted: Professional Football Hall of Fame class of 2022.

References

External links
 NFL.com – 1990 Draft
 databaseFootball.com – 1990 Draft
 Pro Football Hall of Fame

National Football League Draft
NFL Draft
Draft
NFL Draft
NFL Draft
American football in New York City
1990s in Manhattan
Sporting events in New York City
Sports in Manhattan